Meyer Feldberg was the dean of Columbia Business School from 1989 to 2004. He also served as the president of the Illinois Institute of Technology from 1987 to 1989.

Early life and career
Feldberg was born in Johannesburg, South Africa.  He obtained a Bachelor of Arts in Political Science from the University of Witwatersrand in 1962, a Master of Business Administration from Columbia University in 1965, and a Ph.D in Management Strategy from the University of Cape Town in 1968.

In 1972, Feldberg was appointed the Dean of University of Cape Town's Graduate School of Business.  Then, in 1979, he became an associate dean at Northwestern University's business school.  Shortly thereafter, Feldberg was appointed dean of Tulane University's school of business.  Later, in 1987, he became president of the Illinois Institute of Technology.  In 1989, he was appointed Dean of Columbia Business School, stepping down from that position in 2004. In 2007 the Feldberg Fellowship was created in his honor.

References 

1942 births
Living people
Columbia Business School alumni
Presidents of Illinois Institute of Technology
University of Cape Town alumni
University of the Witwatersrand alumni
Columbia Business School faculty